First Presbyterian Church is a historic Presbyterian church building located at 114 W. Main Street in Lincolnton, Lincoln County, North Carolina.  It was built in 1917, and is a rectangular Late Gothic Revival style brick church with projecting corner towers.  It has a front gable slate roof and features shallow, cement-capped buttresses, and lancet-arch windows.  The interior is a modified Akron Plan with a theater-style sanctuary and adjoining space for extra seating or Sunday school.

It was listed on the National Register of Historic Places in 1994.

References

Akron Plan church buildings
Presbyterian churches in North Carolina
Churches on the National Register of Historic Places in North Carolina
Gothic Revival church buildings in North Carolina
Churches completed in 1917
20th-century Presbyterian church buildings in the United States
Churches in Lincoln County, North Carolina
National Register of Historic Places in Lincoln County, North Carolina
1917 establishments in North Carolina